The MYRA School of Business is a business school established in 2012 in Mysore under the aegis of the Mysore Royal Academy (MYRA). The school and its  campus was inaugurated on November 4, 2012.

Programs Offered 
 Post Graduate Diploma in Management (PGDM) (Two-year AICTE-approved MBA equivalent)
 Management Development Programs / Executive Education Programs

Flagship Program

PGDM (Post Graduate Diploma in Management) has

 Data Analytics using Spreadsheet
 Case Methodology
 Introduction to Business Processes and Decisions
 Financial Reporting and Analysis
 Managerial Accounting
 Business Statistics
 Information Systems
 Managerial Economics
 Business, Government and Society
 Project 1
 Organization Development and Behavior
 Strategy
 Market Research and Analytics
 Corporate Finance
 Entrepreneurship
 Operations Management
 Marketing Management
 Macro Economics
 Business Law
 Human Resource Management as core courses

PGDM Students take 32 courses - 16 Core Courses, 12 Electives, 2 Career Services Courses, 3 Projects, and 1 Internship Research Project - totaling 102 credits. Each course is worth 3 credit points.

Partner Schools

Partner Schools:
 Católica Lisbon School of Business & Economics (CLSBE), Portugal - PGDM Global Exchange Partner
 Julius-Maximilians-Universität, Würzburg, Germany - PGDM Global Exchange Partner
 W. P. Carey School of Business, Arizona State University, USA - Founding Academic Partner 
 University of Washington Bothell School of Business, USA - Founding Academic Partner

Centres of Excellence

MYRA has set up 2 Centres of Excellence:
 Centre of Excellence for Sustainable Business Innovations (CESBI)
 Centre of Excellence for Data Analytics and Business Insights (CEDABI)

Campus 
The campus buildings have been called 'avant-garde' and is said to have great architecture.

Milestones

Milestones:
 4 November 2012 – MYRA Campus Inauguration by Shri Deepak Parekh, Chairman, HDFC.
 17–18 December 2012 – Workshop on Governance and Political Economy in association with Warwick University.
 6 January 2013 – Launch of Centre of Excellence in Sustainable Business Innovations (CESBI) and Distinguished Lecture by Prof. Vijay Govindarajan, Coxe Distinguished Professor, Tuck School of Business, Dartmouth College, US.
 24 June 2013 – MYRA Founding Batch Inauguration by Mrs. Meera Sanyal, Chairperson, Royal Bank of Scotland.
 16–17 December 2013 – Second International Conference on Big Data Analytics.
 June 2014 – Recognition by University of Mysore as Research Center.
 31 May 2014 – Graduation of founding Batch Post Graduate Program for eXecutives (PGPX). Chief Guests: Dr.Ramadhar Singh, Distinguished Professor, IIM, Bangalore and Mr. Ashok Mathur, MD, Madura Coats & Regional Chief Executive, South Asia, Coats Plc.
 9 May 2015 – Graduation of founding Batch of Post Graduate Diploma in Management (PGDM) and 2nd Batch of Post Graduate Program for eXecutives (PGPX). Chief Guests: Prof. Rishikesha T Krishnan, Director, Indian Institute of Management, Indore and Mr. R Gopalakrishnan, Non-Executive Director, Tata Sons
 9 March 2016 – Launch of Centre of Excellence for Data Analytics and Business Insights (CEDABI) by Mr. David J Kasik, Senior Technical Fellow, The Boeing Company, Seattle, Washington.
 28 March 2016 – MOU with Dalhousie University, Canada, Mr. Greg Giokas, Consul General of Canada to Bengaluru and Dr. Carolyn Watters, Provost & Vice President, Academic, Dalhousie University, Canada.
 20 June 2016 – Graduation of the 2nd batch of Post Graduate Diploma in Management (PGDM) & 3rd batch of Post Graduate Program for eXecutives (PGPX). Chief Guests: Dr. M G Parameswaran, Founder, Brand-Building.com and Shri Ranjan Mathai, Former Foreign Secretary, Government of India
 30 July 2016 – Inauguration of Devaraj Urs Centre for Development Studies by Shri. Jairam Ramesh, Member of Parliament, Rajya Sabha, Former Minister, Government of India.
 30 May 2017 - Signing of MOU with Cambridge Judge Business Executive Education to offer Executive Education programs in India.
 24 June 2017 – Graduation of the 3rd batch of Post Graduate Diploma in Management (PGDM) & 4th batch of Post Graduate Program for eXecutives (PGPX). Chief Guests: Shri Santosh Desai, MD and CEO of Futurebrands, author & columnist and Dr. Ramasastry Ambarish, Managing Director of RA & Son Pte Ltd., Singapore and Member of Governing board, MYRA 
 13 May 2018 - Graduation of the 4th batch of Post Graduate Diploma in Management (PGDM) & 5th batch of Post Graduate Program for eXecutives (PGPX). Chief Guest, Dr. Viral V Acharya, Deputy Governor, Reserve Bank of India & C.V. Starr Professor of Economics, New York University Stern School of Business, USA
 1 July 2018 - University of Mysore approved Master of Business Administration (MBA) 5 years integrated course
 29 June 2019 - Graduation of the 5th batch of Post Graduate Diploma in Management (PGDM) & 6th batch of Post Graduate Program for eXecutives (PGPX). Chief Guest, Mr. MD Ranganath, Additional Independent Director, HDFC Bank

Distinguished Lecture Series:
 6 January 2013 - Distinguished Lecture 1 on "Reverse Innovation" by Dr. Vijay Govindarajan, Tuck School of Business at Dartmouth College, USA
 25 November 2013 - Distinguished Lecture 2 on "Using Frugal Innovation to create market disruption" by Mr. Suneet S Tuli, Co-Founder and Chief Executive Officer, Datawind Limited
 19 February 2015 - Distinguished Lecture 3 on "Journey of Excellence-Beating Benchmarks and Scaling New Heights of Performance" by Lt Gen SK Gadeock, AVSM, Commandant, Defence Services Staff College
 29 November 2015 - Distinguished Lecture 4 on "The Enduring Value of Management Education" by Dr. Dipak C Jain, Director (Dean), Sasin Graduate Institute of Business Administration, Chulalongkorn, University in Bangkok, Thailand
 18 November 2016 - Distinguished Lecture 5 on "Economic and Social Change and Growth of Indian Business" by Dr. Sanjaya Baru, Distinguished Fellow, United Service Institute of India, New Delhi; Consulting Fellow for India International Institute of Strategic Studies, London; Honorary Senior Fellow, Centre for Policy Research, New Delhi
 26 December 2017 - Distinguished Lecture 6 on "From Research to Action: Using Evidence to Inform Policy" by Mr. Iqbal Dhaliwal, Deputy Executive Director, Abdul Latif Jameel Poverty Action Lab (J-PAL), Massachusetts Institute of Technology (MIT), Cambridge
 18 January 2018 - Distinguished Lecture 7 on "My Journey" by Mr. Arjun Malhotra, Co-founder, HCL Technologies, Former Chairman and CEO, Headstrong

References

Business schools in Karnataka
2011 establishments in Karnataka